The Billboard Hot 100 is a chart that ranks the best-performing songs in the United States. Its data, published by Billboard magazine and compiled by Nielsen SoundScan, is based collectively on each song's weekly physical and digital sales, as well as the amount of airplay received on American radio stations and streaming on online digital music outlets.

During 2019, fifteen singles reached number one on the Hot 100; a sixteenth single, "Thank U, Next" by Ariana Grande, began its run at number one in November 2018. Of those fifteen number-one singles, four were collaborations. In total, eighteen acts topped the chart as either lead or featured artists, with ten—Swae Lee (as a solo artist), Bradley Cooper, Jonas Brothers, Lil Nas X, Billy Ray Cyrus, Billie Eilish, Shawn Mendes, Lizzo, Lewis Capaldi, and Selena Gomez—achieving their first Hot 100 number-one single. 

Lil Nas X's "Old Town Road" was the longest-running number-one of the year, leading the chart for nineteen weeks (one for the song's original version, credited solely to Lil Nas X, and eighteen for a remix featuring Billy Ray Cyrus); in doing so, it broke the record as the longest-running number one single in Billboard history - a record previously held by the sixteen-week runs of both "One Sweet Day" by Mariah Carey (who added a nineteenth number one single in 2019) and Boyz II Men (1995–96), and "Despacito" by Luis Fonsi and Daddy Yankee featuring Justin Bieber (2017). It also topped the Billboard Year-End Hot 100 ranking as the best-performing single of 2019. 

Post Malone and Ariana Grande were the only acts to have multiple number-one songs in 2019, with two apiece.

Chart history

Number-one artists

See also
2019 in American music
List of Billboard 200 number-one albums of 2019 
List of Billboard Hot 100 top-ten singles in 2019
Billboard Year-End Hot 100 singles of 2019

Notes

References

United States Hot 100
2019
Hot 100 number-one singles